These are the squads for the national teams participated in the III World Cup of Masters held in Austria, in the summer of 1995. The tournament was played in two groups, culminating with Brazil winning the cup.

Group A

Head coach: Luciano do Valle

Group B

Head coach:

Head coach:

References

World Cup of Masters events
1995